Antonia Bua (born 23 August 1990) is an Italian footballer who played for the Harrisburg City Islanders in USL Pro.

Career

High school and college
Bua attended Lampeter-Strasburg High School. In 2008, he was named an all-state selection along with Andrew Wenger and Zarek Valentin, both of whom were drafted into Major League Soccer.

Bua played college soccer for York College of Pennsylvania. Over his college career, Bua registered 66 total points on 28 goals and ten assists in 87 games. Included in his 28 career goals were nine game-winning goals. Bua was a 3-time All-CAC selection with the Spartans and was part of the team that won four straight conference championships.

Professional
After trialing with the Harrisburg City Islanders for several weeks, Bua was signed by the club on 3 July 2013. The trial included an impressive performance against the Philadelphia Union of Major League Soccer in which Bua played 26 minutes as a substitute. Bua made his professional league debut on 14 July 2013 in a 0–1 loss to the Richmond Kickers.

References

1990 births
Living people
Italian footballers
Footballers from Palermo
Italian expatriate footballers
Expatriate soccer players in the United States
Association football midfielders
Penn FC players
USL Championship players
Italian expatriate sportspeople in the United States
York College of Pennsylvania alumni